The Zen Studies Society was established in 1956 by Cornelius Crane to help assist the scholar Daisetz Teitaro Suzuki in his work and to help promulgate Zen Buddhism in Western countries.   It operates both New York Zendo Shobo-Ji in New York City and Dai Bosatsu Zendo Kongo-Ji in the Catskills area of New York State. Influenced by the teachings of Soen Nakagawa Roshi and Nyogen Senzaki, ZSS is one of the oldest organizations dedicated to the practice of Rinzai Zen in the United States.

The institution came under the leadership of Eido Tai Shimano in 1965.  Allegations of sexual and financial improprieties surfaced regarding Shimano, causing controversy in the community. In July 2010 Shimano and his wife resigned from the board of directors following the revelation of his relationship with a female student, amid accusations that this was only the latest in series of such affairs.  Shimano also resigned as abbot, and announced he would retire from teaching in any formal capacity.  Roko Sherry Chayat Roshi, one of Shimano's Dharma heirs, was installed as abbot in January 2011.

See also
Buddhism in the United States
Timeline of Zen Buddhism in the United States

Notes

References

External links
Map: 

Zen in the United States
Buddhist temples in New York City
1956 establishments in New York (state)
Religious organizations established in 1956